Yakovlev Yak-50 was an early experimental turbojet interceptor aircraft designed in 1948 by the Yakovlev OKB in the USSR. The aircraft was essentially a stretched version of the Yakovlev Yak-30 (1948), with a more powerful engine and greater wing sweep. The Yak-50 is perhaps most significant as the first Yakovlev aircraft equipped with velosipednoye (bicycle) landing gear, a trademark of later Yakovlev designs. The Yak-50 designation was later reused for a propeller-driven aerobatic and trainer aircraft.

Development and design
On February 21, 1949 a Sovmin order requested the Yakovlev OKB to design a lightweight, radar-equipped, all-weather and night interceptor capable of Mach 0.97 at 4,000 m (13,000 ft). The aircraft was to utilize the Klimov VK-1 engine which first appeared on Mikoyan-Gurevich MiG-15 and MiG-17 fighters. This engine was itself a Soviet copy of the British Rolls-Royce Nene centrifugal turbojet initially known as the RD-45. The leading fighter OKBs each created a prototype to meet the requirement, which included the Lavochkin La-200, MiG I-320, Sukhoi Su-15 (unrelated to the later aircraft with the same designation) and the Yak-50 (again, unrelated to the later aircraft). A major difference was that while Yakolev used one engine, the other design bureaus used two.

Testing 
The aircraft first flew on 15 July 1949, with test pilot Anokhin achieving supersonic speed (Mach 1.03 at 10,000 m (33,000 ft)) in a shallow dive during one of the test flights.

Ultimately, none of the newly developed aircraft was selected, and an upgraded MiG-17 was eventually employed. Yakolev later used the velosipednoye landing gear in the Yak-140 fighter and the Yak-120, and later in the Yak-25 and Yak-28 where it proved highly successful.

The Yak-50 never received an ASCC name or USAF reporting number.

Operators 

 Soviet Air Force

Specifications

See also

References

 Gunston, Bill. Yakovlev Aircraft since 1924. London, UK: Putnam Aeronautical Books, 1997. .

External links

 Repair Yak-50

Abandoned military aircraft projects of the Soviet Union
1940s Soviet fighter aircraft
Yak-050